Aornis may refer to:
Aornis Hades, the Thursday Next series character, or her namesake, a fictional tributary of the river Styx.

See also:
Aornos, the site of the battle fought by Alexander the Great's forces